This article lists special-purpose railway stations, i.e. those which meet one or more of these criteria:
 cannot be accessed by the public from the street;
 can only be accessed from private land;
 can only be accessed by appointment;
 only serve a particular venue, such as a factory, harbour or stadium; or
 are not listed in the public timetable, or provide service on event-days only.
It also lists closed stations that satisfied one or more of these criteria when open, and stations which at some point in their history satisfied one or more of the criteria.

List

Notes

References

Railway stations in the United Kingdom